The volleyball tournaments at the 2024 Summer Olympics in Paris are scheduled to run from 27 July to 11 August 2024. 24 volleyball teams and 48 beach volleyball teams will participate in the tournament. Indoor volleyball competitions will occur at Paris Expo Porte de Versailles with the beach volleyball tournament staged at the Eiffel Tower Stadium in Champ de Mars.

Qualification summary

Indoor volleyball
On 6 April 2022, Fédération Internationale de Volleyball welcomed the International Olympic Committee's decision to approve several changes to the Olympic volleyball program and its qualification system, particularly on the rules of the allocation of the quota places for Paris 2024. Twelve teams per gender will participate in the indoor volleyball tournament. As the host nation, France, the reigning men's champions, reserves a direct spot each for both the men's and women's teams.

The remainder of the twelve-team field per gender must endure a dual qualification pathway to secure the quota places for Paris 2024. First, the winners and runners-up from each of the three Olympic qualification tournaments will qualify directly for the Games. Second, the last five berths will be attributed to the eligible NOCs based on the FIVB world rankings by June 2024 while observing the universality principle, that is, prioritizing those from the continents without a qualified team yet in the Paris 2024 tournament.

Men's volleyball

Women's volleyball

Beach volleyball
Twenty-four teams per gender will participate in the beach volleyball tournament with a maximum of two per NOC. As the host nation, France reserves the direct spot for both the men's and women's beach volleyball teams. 

The remainder of the twenty-four team field must endure a tripartite qualification pathway to obtain a ticket for Paris 2024, abiding by the universality principle and respecting the two-team NOC limit. The initial spot will be directly awarded to the men's and women's winners, respectively, from the 2023 FIVB World Championships, scheduled for 6 to 15 October in Tlaxcala, Mexico, with the seventeen highest-ranked eligible pairs joining them in the field through the FIVB Olympic ranking list (based on the twelve best performances achieved as a pair) between 1 January 2023 and 10 June 2024. The final five spots will be attributed to the eligible NOCs from each of the five continental qualification tournaments (Africa – CAVB; Asia and Oceania – AVC; Europe – CEV; North America, Central America, and the Caribbean – NORCECA; and South America – CSV).

Men's beach volleyball

Women's beach volleyball

Medal summary

Medal table

Events

Indoor volleyball

Beach volleyball

See also
 Volleyball at the 2022 Asian Games
 Volleyball at the 2023 Pan American Games

References

 
2024 Summer Olympics events
2024
2024 in volleyball
Olympic